Batiniyya refers to groups that distinguish between an outer, exoteric (zāhir) and an inner, esoteric (bāṭin) meaning in Islamic scriptures. The term has been used in particular for an allegoristic type of scriptural interpretation developed among some Shia groups, stressing the bāṭin meaning of texts. It has been retained by all branches of Isma'ilism and various Druze groups as well. The Alawites practice a similar system of interpretation. Batiniyya is a common epithet used to designate Isma'ili Islam, which has been accepted by Ismai'lis themselves.

Sunni writers have used the term batiniyya polemically in reference to rejection of the evident meaning of scripture in favor of its bāṭin meaning. Al-Ghazali, a medieval Sunni theologian, used the term batiniyya pejoratively for the adherents of Isma'ilism. Some Shia writers have also used the term polemically.

See also
 Batin (Islam)
 Esoteric interpretation of the Quran

References

Esoteric schools of thought
Islam-related slurs
Ismailism
Islamic branches